Dominic Roche (1902–1972), was a British actor and playwright. His 'North country farce' My Wife's Lodger had a West End run in 1950,and was filmed with Roche in the leading role. The BFI Screenonline observed, "Roche's impressively spiky, downbeat script is peppered with dryly effective cynicism."

Selected filmography
 My Wife's Lodger (1952)
 What Every Woman Wants (1954)
 The Quare Fellow (1962)
 Richard the Lionheart (TV series) (1962–1963)
 Paddy (1970)

References

External links

 My Wife's Lodger at BFI Screenonline

1902 births
1972 deaths
British male film actors